Douglas Kempsell (born 13 April 1993 in Edinburgh) is a professional squash player who represented Scotland. He reached a career-high world ranking of World No. 92 in May 2017.

References

External links 
 
 

1993 births
Living people
Scottish male squash players
Competitors at the 2017 World Games